This page details the match results and statistics of the Sierra Leone national football team from 2020 to present.

Results
Sierra Leone's score is shown first in each case.

Notes

Record by opponent

References

Sierra Leone national football team results
2020s in Sierra Leone